Gutenburg may refer to:
 Gutenburg, Switzerland, Canton of Bern

See also 
 Johannes Gutenberg, German inventor of lead-based movable type for printing
 Guttenburg, a German brig wrecked on the Goodwin Sands on 1 January 1860
 Gutenberg (disambiguation)
 Guttenberg (disambiguation)